Bannock, skaan (or scone), Indian bread or frybread is found throughout North American Native cuisine, including that of the Inuit of Canada and Alaska, other Alaska Natives, the First Nations of the rest of Canada, the Native Americans in the United States, and the Métis.

Origins 

A type of bannock, using available resources, such as flour made from maize, roots, tree sap and leavening agents, may have been produced by indigenous North Americans prior to contact with outsiders, similar to modern cornbread. Some sources claim that bannock was unknown in North America until the 1860s when it was created by the Navajo who were incarcerated at Fort Sumner, while others indicate that it came from a Scottish source. Native American tribes who ate camas include the Nez Perce, Cree, Coast Salish, Lummi, and Blackfoot tribes, among many others. Camas bulbs contributed to the survival of members of the expedition of Lewis and Clark (1804–06).  Camas bulbs (and bannock made from them) are listed in the Ark of Taste.

Terminology 

Preparation 
Bannock is generally prepared with white or whole wheat flour, baking powder, sugar, lard and water or milk, which are combined and kneaded (possibly with spices, dried fruits or other flavouring agents added) then fried in rendered fat, vegetable oil, or shortening, baked in an oven or cooked on a stick.

Political significance 
Bannock is the most universal of dishes in the indigenous Canadian repertoire, and is used equally in the Arctic, Plains, Sub-arctic, and Pacific cultural areas. However, the modern recipes for bannock are clearly influenced by the government rations that were distributed on Indian reserves in the late 19th century when access to country foods (plants and animals native to the region) were restricted by the arrival of non-indigenous settlers.  Such rations included the staples of the European Canadian diet at that time: wheat flour, sugar, lard, and butter; all high-calorie, low-nutrient, shelf-stable foods produced in bulk quantities and shipped long distances (together with the preservative and flavour additive, salt). These new ingredients helped indigenous people to survive the loss of access to country foods, and are now thought of by some as fully a part of indigenous identity, and even as "Indian soul food". However, for others they are a reminder of the negative impacts of colonialism, and are regarded as an imposition.

Relationship with Indigenous Peoples 
The history and political significance of bannock has changed over the years in North America. Bannock has had and continues to hold great significance to Indigenous American peoples, from pre-contact to the present.

The bannock of many pre-contact American peoples was made of corn and nut meal, and flour made from various roots and ground plant bulbs, and sweetened with syrup from trees. There were many regional variations of bannock that included different types of flour, and the addition of dried or fresh fruit. The method of cooking was similarly diverse. Some rolled the dough in sand then pit-cooked it. When completed, the sand was brushed off and then the bread was consumed. Other groups baked the bannock in clay or rock ovens. while some wrapped the dough around a green, hardwood stick and toasted it over an open fire. Bannock's functionality made it viable to cook and consume while conducting daily activities at home, or hunting, trapping, fishing, and gathering out on the land. 

Colonization dramatically changed the traditional ways of Indigenous Americans, including the relationship they had with bannock. Whereas bannock was once a food of function for travel and work, it became a necessary staple for Indigenous people to feed their families and stave off starvation when they were forced to give up much of their traditional food sources through the reservation system. On these reserves, traditional methods of hunting, gathering, and farming was replaced by government food rations, usually consisting of flour and lard. As a result of this policy, indigenous knowledge of edible plants and other natural foodstuff was lost, while wheat and flour entered into Indigenous bannock recipes, drastically altering their nature.

See also 

 Bannock (food)
 Damper (food)
 List of quick breads

References

Further reading 
 Barkwell, Lawrence J.; Dorion, Leah; Hourie, Audreen (2006). Métis Legacy (Volume II): Michif Culture, Heritage, and Folkways. Winnipeg: Pemmican Publications Inc. and Saskatoon: Gabriel Dumont Institute. .

Quick breads
Flatbreads
Deep fried foods
American breads
Celtic words and phrases
Indigenous cuisine in Canada
Alaskan cuisine
Inuit cuisine
Native American cuisine
First Nations culture
Cuisine of the Western United States